Philosophers born in the 20th century (and others important in the history of philosophy) listed alphabetically:

Note: This list has a minimal criterion for inclusion and the relevance to philosophy of some individuals on the list is disputed.

A 
 Elisa Aaltola (born 1976)
 Richard Aaron (1901–1987)
 Gholamreza Aavani (born 1943)
 Nicola Abbagnano (1901–1990)
 Ruth Abbey (born 1961)
 Bijan Abdolkarimi (born 1963)
 Taha Abdurrahman (born 1944)
 Masao Abe (1915–2006)
 Henry D. Abelove (born 1945)
 Raziel Abelson (1921–2017)
 Miguel Abensour (1939–2017)
 Arash Abizadeh
 William Emmanuel Abraham (born 1934)
 David Abram (born 1957)
 Gerd B. Achenbach (born 1947)
 Peter Achinstein (born 1935)
 Hans Achterhuis (born 1942)
 Felicia Nimue Ackerman (born 1947)
 J. L. Ackrill (1921–2007)
 H. B. Acton (1908–1974)
 Carol J. Adams (born 1951)
 James Luther Adams (1901–1994)
 Marilyn McCord Adams (1943–2017)
 Maynard Adams (1919–2003)
 Robert Merrihew Adams (born 1937)
 Peter Adamson (born 1972)
 Matthew Adler (born 1962)
 Mortimer J. Adler (1902–2001)
 Mantas Adomėnas (born 1972)
 Theodor Adorno (1903–1969)
 Sediq Afghan (born 1958)
 Michel Aflaq (1910–1989)
 Sylviane Agacinski (born 1945)
 Giorgio Agamben (born 1942)
 Joseph Agassi (born 1927)
 Khurshid Ahmad (born 1932)
 Arif Ahmed
 Scott Aikin (born 1971)
 Timo Airaksinen (born 1947)
 Shabbir Akhtar (born 1960)
 Lilli Alanen (1941–2021)
 Rachel Albeck-Gidron (born 1960)
 David Albert (born 1954)
 Hans Albert (born 1921)
 Rogers Albritton (1923–2002)
 Linda Martín Alcoff (born 1955)
 Virgil Aldrich (1903–1998)
 Gerda Alexander (1908–1994)
 Aleksandr Danilovich Aleksandrov (1912–1999)
 Robert Alexy (born 1945)
 Keimpe Algra (born 1959)
 Lucy Allais
 George James Allan (born 1935)
 Trevor Allan (born 1955)
 Amy Allen
 Anita L. Allen (born 1953)
 Diogenes Allen (1932–2013)
 William B. Allen (born 1944)
 Henry E. Allison (born 1937)
 Ferdinand Alquié (1906–1985)
 William Alston (1921–2009)
 Jimmy Altham (born 1944)
 Louis Althusser (1918–1990)
 Thomas J. J. Altizer (1927–2018)
 Alexander Altmann (1906–1987)
 Peter Alward (born 1964)
 Alice Ambrose (1906–2001)
 Karl Ameriks (born 1947)
 Roger T. Ames (born 1947)
 Günther Anders (1902–1992)
 Alan Ross Anderson (1925–1973)
 C. Anthony Anderson (born 1940)
 Elizabeth S. Anderson (born 1959)
 John Mueller Anderson (1914–1999)
 Pamela Sue Anderson (1955–2017)
 R. Lanier Anderson
 Judith Andre
 Kristin Andrews (born 1971)
 Antanas Andrijauskas (born 1948)
 Irving Anellis (1946–2013)
 Ian Angus (born 1949)
 Loreta Anilionytė
 Julia Annas (born 1946)
 G. E. M. Anscombe (1918–2001)
 Keith Ansell-Pearson (born 1960)
 Dario Antiseri (born 1940)
 Maria Rosa Antognazza (born 1964)
 John P. Anton (1920–2014)
 G. Aldo Antonelli (1962–2015)
 Louise Antony
 Karl-Otto Apel (1922–2017)
 Kwame Anthony Appiah (born 1954)
 Richard Appignanesi (born 1940)
 Richard Aquila (born 1944)
 Lennart Åqvist (born 1932)
 István Aranyosi (born 1975)
 Reza Davari Ardakani (born 1933)
 Hannah Arendt (1906–1975)
 Türker Armaner (born 1968)
 Leslie Armour (1931–2014)
 A. H. Armstrong (1909–1997)
 David Malet Armstrong (1926–2014)
 John Armstrong (born 1966)
 Juan Arnau (born 1968)
 Richard Arneson
 Rudolf Arnheim (1904–2007)
 Raymond Aron (1905–1983)
 Robert Arp (born 1970)
 Nomy Arpaly (born 1973)
 Robert Arrington (1938–2015)
 Kenneth Arrow (1921–2017)
 Zaki al-Arsuzi (1899–1968)
 Sergei N. Artemov (born 1951)
 John Arthur (1946–2007)
 Mariano Artigas (1938–2006)
 Adil Asadov (born 1958)
 Molefi Kete Asante (born 1942)
 Karl Aschenbrenner (1911–1988)
 Pandurang Shastri Athavale (1920–2003)
 Margaret Atherton (born 1943)
 George N. Atiyeh (1923–2008)
 Ronald Field Atkinson (1928–2005)
 Henri Atlan (born 1931)
 Syed Muhammad Naquib al-Attas (born 1931)
 Robin Attfield (born 1931)
 Elspeth Attwooll (born 1943)
 Gwenaëlle Aubry (born 1971)
 Robert Audi (born 1941)
 Lene Auestad (born 1973)
 John Langshaw Austin (1911–1960)
 Randall Auxier (born 1961)
 Armen Avanessian (born 1973)
 Jeremy Avigad (born 1968)
 Anita Avramides (born 1952)
 Kostas Axelos (1924–2010)
 Francisco J. Ayala (born 1934)
 Alfred Jules Ayer (1910–1989)
 Michael R. Ayers (born 1935)
 Hiroki Azuma (born 1971)
 Joxe Azurmendi (born 1941)
 Salvino Azzopardi (1931–2006)
 Jody Azzouni (born 1954)

B 
 Harriet Baber (born 1950)
 Babette Babich (born 1956)
 Kent Bach (born 1943)
 Bronisław Baczko (1924–2016)
 Alain Badiou (born 1937)
 Julian Baggini (born 1968)
 Archie J. Bahm (1907–1996)
 Annette Baier (1929–2012)
 Kurt Baier (1917–2010)
 Moya Bailey
 Alan Baker
 Gordon Park Baker (1938–2002)
 Lynne Rudder Baker (1944–2017)
 Albena Bakratcheva (born 1961)
 Gopal Balakrishnan (born 1966)
 Tom Baldwin (born 1947)
 Étienne Balibar (born 1942)
 Renford Bambrough (1926–1999)
 Hassan al-Banna (1906–1949)
 Michael Banner (born 1961)
 Yehoshua Bar-Hillel (1915–1975)
 Dorit Bar-On (born 1955)
 Karen Barad (born 1956)
 Amiri Baraka (1934–2014)
 José Barata-Moura (born 1948)
 Renaud Barbaras (born 1955)
 Ian Barbour (1923–2013)
 Alejandro Bárcenas
 Sidi Mohamed Barkat (born 1948)
 Jason Barker (born 1971)
 Stephen F. Barker (1927–2019)
 Elizabeth Barnes
 Hazel Barnes (1915–2008)
 Jonathan Barnes (born 1942)
 Marcia Baron (born 1955)
 William Barrett (1913–1992)
 Eduardo Barrio
 Phillip Barron
 Brian Barry (1936–2009)
 Christian Barry
 Norman P. Barry (1944–2008)
 Roland Barthes (1915–1980)
 Lauren Swayne Barthold (born 1965)
 Sandra Bartky (1935–2016)
 Steven James Bartlett (born 1945)
 W. W. Bartley III (1934–1990)
 Renate Bartsch (born 1939)
 Shadi Bartsch (born 1966)
 Jon Barwise (1942–2000)
 Jacques Barzun (1907–2012)
 David Basinger (born 1947)
 Diderik Batens (born 1944)
 Gregory Bateson (1904–1980)
 David Batstone (born 1958)
 Jean Baudrillard (1929–2007)
 Nancy Bauer (born 1960)
 Zygmunt Bauman (1925–2017)
 Charles A. Baylis (1902–1975)
 Francoise Baylis (born 1961)
 Jc Beall (born 1966)
 Monroe Beardsley (1915–1985)
 Tom Beauchamp (born 1939)
 Jean Beaufret (1907–1982)
 Emily Beausoleil
 Simone de Beauvoir (1908–1986)
 Anthony Beavers (born 1963)
 William Bechtel (born 1951)
 Lewis White Beck (1913–1997)
 Gerhold K. Becker (born 1943)
 Lawrence C. Becker (1939–2018)
 Francis J. Beckwith (born 1960)
 Hugo Bedau (1926–2012)
 Mark Bedau (born 1950)
 Helen Beebee (born 1968)
 Hasna Begum (1935–2020)
 Ernst Behler (1928–1997)
 Werner Beierwaltes (1931–2019)
 Frederick C. Beiser (born 1949)
 Charles Beitz (born 1949)
 Daniel Bell (1919–2011)
 John Lane Bell (born 1945)
 Shannon Bell (born 1955)
 Robert N. Bellah (1927–2013)
 Kathryn Sophia Belle (born 1978)
 Nuel Belnap (born 1930)
 Yemima Ben-Menahem (born 1946)
 Aaron Ben-Ze'ev (born 1949)
 Paul Benacerraf (born 1931)
 Linos Benakis (born 1928)
 José Benardete (1928–2016)
 Seth Benardete (1930–2001)
 David Benatar (born 1966)
 Seyla Benhabib (born 1950)
 Piers Benn (born 1962)
 Jonathan Bennett (born 1930)
 Geoffrey Bennington (born 1956)
 Alain de Benoist (born 1943)
 Bruce Ellis Benson (born 1960)
 Sergio Benvenuto (born 1948)
 Floris van den Berg (born 1973)
 Peter L. Berger (1929–2017)
 Frithjof Bergmann (1930–2021)
 Gustav Bergmann (1906–1987)
 Michael Bergmann (born 1964)
 Lars Bergström
 Arnold Berleant (born 1932)
 Isaiah Berlin (1909–1997)
 Marshall Berman (1940–2013)
 José Benardete (1928–2016)
 Seth Benardete (1930–2001)
 Robert Bernasconi (born 1950)
 Walter Berns (1919–2015)
 Andrew Bernstein (born 1949)
 Jay Bernstein (born 1947)
 Mark H. Bernstein
 Richard J. Bernstein (born 1932)
 Marcus Berquist (1934–2010)
 Wendell Berry (born 1934)
 Ludwig von Bertalanffy (1901–1972)
 Peter Anthony Bertocci (1910–1989)
 Steven Best (born 1955)
 Gábor Betegh (born 1968)
 Richard Bett
 Mark Bevir (born 1963)
 Jean-Yves Béziau (born 1965)
 Homi K. Bhabha (born 1949)
 Roy Bhaskar (1944–2014)
 Nalini Bhushan
 Vladimir Bibikhin (1938–2004)
 Cristina Bicchieri (born 1950)
 Jacques Bidet (born 1935)
 Jean Biès (1933–2014)
 Simone Bignall
 Anat Biletzki (born 1952)
 Akeel Bilgrami (born 1950)
 Purushottama Bilimoria
 Nikola Biller-Andorno
 Katalin Bimbó (born 1963)
 Harry Binswanger (born 1944)
 Alexander Bird (born 1964)
 Garrett Birkhoff (1911–1996)
 Peg Birmingham
 Jeffrey Bishop (born 1967)
 Frode Alfson Bjørdal (born 1944)
 Max Black (1909–1988)
 Simon Blackburn (born 1944)
 Russell Blackford (born 1954)
 Oliva Blanchette (1929–2021)
 Patricia Blanchette
 Maurice Blanchot (1907–2003)
 Joseph Leon Blau (1909–1986)
 David Blitz
 Ned Block (born 1942)
 Allan Bloom (1930–1992)
 Lawrence Blum (born 1943)
 Albert Blumberg (1906–1997)
 Hans Blumenberg (1920–1996)
 Andy Blunden (born 1945)
 Norberto Bobbio (1909–2004)
 Chris Bobonich (born 1960)
 Susanne Bobzien (born 1960)
 Jozef Maria Bochenski (1902–1995)
 Remo Bodei (1938–2019)
 Margaret Boden (born 1936)
 James Bogen
 Paul Boghossian (born 1957)
 Peter Boghossian
 David Bohm (1917–1992)
 Gernot Böhme (born 1937)
 Hilary Bok (born 1959)
 Sissela Bok (born 1934)
 Alisa Bokulich
 Daniel Bonevac
 Dietrich Bonhoeffer (1906–1945)
 Laurence BonJour (born 1943)
 Murray Bookchin (1921–2006)
 George Boolos (1940–1996)
 William James Booth
 Susan Bordo
 Michael Bordt (born 1960)
 Emma Borg
 Albert Borgmann (born 1937)
 Eugene Borowitz (1924–2016)
 Giovanna Borradori
 Lisa Bortolotti (born 1974)
 David Bostock (1936–2019)
 Inga Bostad (born 1963)
 Nick Bostrom (born 1973)
 George Botterill (born 1949)
 Eileen Hunt Botting (born 1971)
 Alain de Botton (born 1969)
 Tina Fernandes Botts
 Pierre Bourdieu (1930–2002)
 Jacques Bouveresse (1940–2021)
 Luc Bovens
 David Frederick Bowers (1906–1945)
 Andrew Bowie (born 1952)
 Bernard Boxill
 Jan Boxill (born 1939)
 Richard Boyd (1942–2021)
 Joseph A. Bracken (born 1930)
 Costica Bradatan
 Richard Bradley (born 1964)
 Michael Brady (born 1965)
 Rémi Brague (born 1947)
 Rosi Braidotti (born 1954)
 David Braine (1940–2017)
 Richard-Bevan Braithwaite (1900–1990)
 Theodore Brameld (1904–1987)
 Myles Brand (1942–2009)
 Robert Brandom (born 1950)
 Richard B. Brandt (1910–1997)
 Eva Brann (born 1929)
 Ray Brassier (born 1965)
 Michael Bratman (born 1945)
 Stephen E. Braude (born 1945)
 David Braybrooke (1924–2013)
 Geoffrey Brennan (born 1944)
 Jason Brennan (born 1979)
 Samantha Brennan
 Teresa Brennan (1952–2003)
 Bill Brewer
 Jean Bricmont (born 1952)
 Ingo Brigandt
 Harry Brighouse
 Liam Kofi Bright
 David O. Brink (born 1958)
 Susan Brison
 Luc Brisson (born 1946)
 Charles Francis Brittain
 Alexander Broadie
 Sarah Broadie (1941–2021)
 Dan W. Brock (1937–2020)
 May Brodbeck (1917–1983)
 Berit Brogaard (born 1970)
 Johannes Bronkhorst (born 1946)
 Stephen Bronner (born 1949)
 Thom Brooks (born 1973)
 John Broome (born 1947)
 Janet Broughton
 Harvey Brown (born 1950)
 Wendy Brown (born 1955)
 Kimberley Brownlee (born 1978)
 Bartosz Brożek (born 1977)
 Pascal Bruckner (born 1948)
 Robert Brumbaugh (1918–1992)
 Fernand Brunner (1920–1991)
 Brian Bruya (born 1966)
 Edwin Bryant (born 1957)
 Levi Bryant
 Jeffrey Bub (born 1942)
 Allen Buchanan (born 1948)
 Ian Buchanan (born 1969)
 James M. Buchanan (1919–2013)
 Gerd Buchdahl (1914–2001)
 Justus Buchler (1914–1991)
 Henry Bugbee (1915–1999)
 Mario Bunge (1919–2020)
 Martin Bunzl (born 1948)
 Tyler Burge (born 1946)
 Ronna Burger (born 1947)
 J. Peter Burgess (born 1961)
 John P. Burgess (born 1948)
 Teresa Blankmeyer Burke
 Arthur Burks (1915–2008)
 James Burnham (1905–1987)
 John Burnheim (born 1928)
 Elizabeth Burns
 Myles Burnyeat (1939–2019)
 David Burrell (born 1933)
 Roderick D. Bush (1945–2013)
 Panayot Butchvarov (born 1933)
 Judith Butler (born 1956)
 Jeremy Butterfield (born 1954)
 Victor L. Butterfield (1904–1975)
 Stephen Butterfill
 Charles Butterworth (born 1938)

C 
 Amílcar Cabral (1924–1973)
 Julio Cabrera
 Massimo Cacciari (born 1944)
 John Cage (1912–1992)
 Cheshire Calhoun
 Daniel Callahan (1930–2019)
 Joan Callahan (1946–2019)
 Agnes Callard (born 1976)
 Craig Callender (born 1968)
 J. Baird Callicott (born 1941)
 Elisabeth Camp
 Donald T. Campbell (1916–1996)
 John Campbell (born 1956)
 Joseph Campbell (1904–1987)
 Victoria Camps (born 1941)
 Albert Camus (1913–1960)
 Georges Canguilhem (1904–1995)
 Leslie Cannold
 Monique Canto-Sperber (born 1954)
 Milič Čapek (1909–1997)
 Herman Cappelen (born 1967)
 John D. Caputo (born 1940)
 Josiah S. Carberry (born 1929)
 Claudia Card (1940–2015)
 Taylor Carman (born 1965)
 Walter Carnielli (born 1952)
 Eduardo Carrasco (born 1940)
 Peter Carravetta (born 1951)
 Peter Carruthers (born 1952)
 Arturo Carsetti (born 1940)
 Rachel Carson (1907–1964)
 Alan Carter (born 1952)
 Nancy Cartwright (born 1944)
 Richard Cartwright (1925–2010)
 Olavo de Carvalho (1947–2022)
 Edward S. Casey (born 1939)
 Quassim Cassam (born 1961)
 Barbara Cassin (born 1947)
 Pierre Cassou-Noguès (born 1971)
 Hector-Neri Castañeda (1924–1991)
 Roberto Castillo (1950–2008)
 David Castle (born 1967)
 Cornelius Castoriadis (1922–1997)
 Jean Cavaillès (1903–1944)
 Paola Cavalieri (born 1950)
 Stanley Cavell (1926–2018)
 Christopher Celenza (born 1967)
 Michel de Certeau (1925–1986)
 Arindam Chakrabarti
 Anjan Chakravartty
 Alan Chalmers (born 1939)
 David Chalmers (born 1966)
 Clare Chambers (born 1976)
 Timothy Chambers
 Wing-tsit Chan (1901–1994)
 Hasok Chang (born 1967)
 Ruth Chang
 Vere Claiborne Chappell (1930–2019)
 David Charles
 Debiprasad Chattopadhyaya (1918–1993)
 Haridas Chaudhuri (1913–1975)
 Albert Chernenko (1935–2009)
 Harold F. Cherniss (1904–1987)
 Mark Cherry
 Ronda Chervin (born 1937)
 Charles Chihara (1932–2020)
 James Childress (born 1940)
 Roderick Chisholm (1916–1999)
 William Chittick (born 1943)
 Kah Kyung Cho (born 1927)
 Pema Chödrön (born 1936)
 Noam Chomsky (born 1928)
 Alonzo Church (1903–1995)
 Patricia Churchland (born 1943)
 Paul Churchland (born 1942)
 C. West Churchman (1913–2004)
 Frank Cioffi (1928–2012)
 Emil Cioran (1911–1995)
 Joanne B. Ciulla (born 1952)
 Hélène Cixous (born 1937)
 Jean Clam (born 1958)
 Andy Clark (born 1957)
 Gordon Clark (1902–1985)
 Stephen R. L. Clark (born 1945)
 Desmond Clarke (1942–2016)
 W. Norris Clarke (1915–2008)
 Carol Cleland (born 1948)
 Justin Clemens (born 1969)
 Catherine Clément (born 1939)
 Paul Cliteur (born 1955)
 Sharyn Clough (born 1965)
 C. A. J. Coady (born 1936)
 John B. Cobb (born 1925)
 David Cockburn (born 1949)
 Alan Code (born 1951)
 Lorraine Code (born 1937)
 Felix S. Cohen (1907–1953)
 Gerald Cohen (1941–2009)
 Joshua Cohen (born 1951)
 L. Jonathan Cohen (1923–2006)
 Selma Jeanne Cohen (1920–2005)
 Priscilla Cohn (1933–2019)
 David R. Cole (born 1967)
 Jules Coleman (born 1947)
 Lucio Colletti (1924–2001)
 Patricia Hill Collins (born 1948)
 Robin Collins
 Mark Colyvan
 John Joseph Compton (1928–2014)
 André Comte-Sponville (born 1952)
 Marcel Conche (born 1922)
 James H. Cone (1938–2018)
 Deborah Cook (1954–2020)
 Joyce Mitchell Cook (1933–2014)
 Ursula Coope (born 1969)
 David E. Cooper (born 1942)
 John M. Cooper (born 1939)
 Rachel Cooper (born 1974)
 Jack Copeland (born 1950)
 Brian Copenhaver (born 1942)
 Irving Copi (1917–2002)
 Joan Copjec
 Frederick Copleston (1907–1994)
 Henry Corbin (1903–1978)
 John Corcoran (1937–2021)
 Viola Cordova (1937–2002)
 Carla Cordua (born 1925)
 David Corfield
 Drucilla Cornell (born 1950)
 Newton da Costa (born 1929)
 John Cottingham (born 1943)
 William Craig (1918–2016)
 William Lane Craig (born 1949)
 Tim Crane (born 1962)
 Alice Crary (born 1967)
 Robert P. Crease (born 1953)
 Richard Creath (born 1947)
 Max Cresswell (born 1939)
 Roger Crisp (born 1961)
 Simon Critchley (born 1960)
 Helena Cronin (born 1942)
 Robert Craigie Cross (1911–2000)
 Richard Crossman (1907–1974)
 Antonio Cua (1932–2007)
 Ann Cudd
 Garrett Cullity
 Robert Denoon Cumming (1916–2004)
 Chris Cuomo
 Don Cupitt (born 1934)
 Tommy J. Curry
 Jean Curthoys (born 1947)
 James T. Cushing (1937–2002)

D 
 François Dagognet (1924–2015)
 Robert Dahl (1915–2014)
 Daniel O. Dahlstrom (born 1948)
 Mary Daly (1928–2010)
 Jonathan Dancy (born 1946)
 Arthur Danto (1924–2013)
 Lindley Darden (born 1945)
 Stephen Darwall (born 1946)
 Arnold Davidson (born 1955)
 Donald Davidson (1917–2003)
 Brian Davies (born 1951)
 Martin Davies (born 1950)
 Stephen Davies
 Angela Davis (born 1944)
 Diane Davis (born 1963)
 Michael Davis (born 1943)
 Guy Debord (1931–1994)
 Vianney Décarie (1917–2009)
 Mario De Caro (born 1963)
 Helen De Cruz (born 1978)
 John Deely (1942–2017)
 Maximilian de Gaynesford (born 1968)
 Richard T. De George (born 1933)
 John J. DeGioia (born 1957)
 David DeGrazia (born 1962)
 Charles De Koninck (1906–1965)
 Manuel DeLanda (born 1952)
 Gilles Deleuze (1925–1995)
 Bernard Delfgaauw (1912–1993)
 Paul de Man (1919–1983)
 Lara Denis (born 1969)
 Daniel Dennett (born 1942)
 Douglas Den Uyl (born 1950)
 Keith DeRose (born 1962)
 Jacques Derrida (1930–2004)
 Giorgio de Santillana (1902–1974)
 Peggy DesAutels
 Vincent Descombes (born 1943)
 Ronald de Sousa (born 1940)
 Michael Detlefsen (1948–2019)
 Eliot Deutsch (1931–2020)
 Karl Deutsch (1912–1992)
 Penelope Deutscher
 Philippe Devaux (1902–1979)
 Michael Devitt (born 1938)
 Hent de Vries (born 1958)
 L. Harold DeWolf (1905-1986)
 Meena Dhanda
 Cora Diamond (born 1937)
 Donna Dickenson (born 1946)
 George Dickie (1926–2020)
 Michael R. Dietrich (born 1963)
 Susan Ann Dimock
 Zoran Đinđić (1952–2003)
 Rosalyn Diprose
 Do-ol (born 1948)
 Daniel Dombrowski (born 1953)
 Alan Donagan (1925–1991)
 Sue Donaldson (born 1962)
 Keith Donnellan (1931–2015)
 Josephine Donovan (born 1941)
 Mark Dooley (born 1970)
 Jude Patrick Dougherty (1930–2021)
 Igor Douven
 Bradley Dowden (born 1942)
 Lisa Downing (born 1974)
 Paul Draper (born 1957)
 William Herbert Dray (1921–2009)
 Burton Dreben (1927–1999)
 Fred Dretske (1932–2013)
 James Drever (1910–1991)
 Hubert Dreyfus (1929–2017)
 Julia Driver
 Shadia Drury (born 1950)
 Dominique Dubarle (1907–1987)
 Aleksandr Dugin (born 1962)
 Michael Dummett (1925–2011)
 Fernand Dumont (1927–1997)
 Raya Dunayevskaya (1910–1987)
 Jon Michael Dunn (1941–2021)
 John Dupré (born 1952)
 Louis Dupré (born 1925)
 Denis Dutton (1944–2010)
 Divya Dwivedi
 Gerald Dworkin (born 1937)
 Ronald Dworkin (1931–2013)
 Davor Džalto (born 1980)
 Miroslaw Dzielski (1941–1989)

E 
 William A. Earle (1919–1988)
 John Earman (born 1942)
 Kenny Easwaran
 John Eccles (1903–1997)
 Umberto Eco (1932–2016)
 Abraham Edel (1908–2007)
 Gerald Edelman (1929–2014)
 Dorothy Edgington (born 1941)
 James M. Edie (1927–1998)
 Lez Edmond
 David Edmonds (born 1964)
 Paul Edwards (1923–2004)
 Frances Egan
 Margaret Elizabeth Egan (1905–1959)
 Carolyn Eisele (1902–2000)
 Alexandra Elbakyan (born 1988)
 Mircea Eliade (1907–1986)
 Ignacio Ellacuría (1930–1989)
 Carl Elliott (born 1961)
 Deni Elliott
 Brian David Ellis (born 1929)
 Jacques Ellul (1912–1994)
 Jean Bethke Elshtain (1941–2013)
 Jon Elster (born 1940)
 Charles R. Embry
 Dorothy Emmet (1904–2000)
 Pascal Engel (born 1954)
 David Enoch
 Erik Erikson (1902–1994)
 John Etchemendy (born 1952)
 Amitai Etzioni (born 1929)
 Jin Eun-young (born 1970)
 C. Stephen Evans (born 1948)
 Gareth Evans (1946–1980)
 Stanley Eveling (1925–2008)
 Nir Eyal (born 1970)
 Emmanuel Chukwudi Eze (1963–2007)

F 
 Cécile Fabre (born 1971)
 Emil Fackenheim (1916–2003)
 Anne Fagot-Largeault (born 1938)
 Frantz Fanon (1925–1961)
 Delia Graff Fara (1969–2017)
 Marvin Farber (1901–1980)
 Catia Faria (born 1980)
 Austin Marsden Farrer (1904–1968)
 James E. Faulconer (born 1947)
 Joanne Faulkner (born 1972)
 Keith W. Faulkner
 Silvia Federici (born 1942)
 Andrew Feenberg (born 1943)
 Solomon Feferman (1928–2016)
 Carla Fehr
 Herbert Feigl (1902–1988)
 Joel Feinberg (1926–2004)
 Fred Feldman (born 1941)
 Ann Ferguson (born 1938)
 Maurizio Ferraris (born 1956)
 José Ferrater Mora (1912–1991)
 Frederick Ferré (1933–2013)
 Luc Ferry (born 1951)
 Paul Feyerabend (1924–1994)
 Hartry Field (born 1946)
 James Fieser
 Carrie Figdor
 J. N. Findlay (1903–1987)
 Arthur Fine (born 1937)
 Gail Fine
 Kit Fine (born 1946)
 Martha Albertson Fineman (born 1943)
 Bruno de Finetti (1906–1985)
 Herbert Fingarette (1921–2018)
 Eugen Fink (1905–1975)
 John Finnis (born 1940)
 Lawrence Finsen
 Susan Finsen
 Roderick Firth (1917–1987)
 John Martin Fischer (born 1952)
 Frederic Fitch (1908–1987)
 Branden Fitelson (born 1969)
 Owen Flanagan (born 1940)
 Kurt Flasch (born 1930)
 Richard E. Flathman (1934–2015)
 Joseph Fletcher (1905–1991)
 Antony Flew (1923–2010)
 Katrin Flikschuh 
 Luciano Floridi (born 1964)
 Elizabeth Flower (1914–1995)
 Juliet Floyd
 Vilém Flusser (1920–1991)
 James R. Flynn (1934–2020)
 Thomas R. Flynn (born 1936)
 Jerry Fodor (1935–2017)
 Robert Fogelin (1932–2016)
 Dagfinn Føllesdal (born 1932)
 William Fontaine (1909-1968)
 Philippa Foot (1920–2010)
 Graeme R. Forbes
 Peter Forrest (born 1948)
 John Forrester (1949–2015)
 Rainer Forst (born 1964)
 Michel Foucault (1926–1984)
 Bas van Fraassen (born 1941)
 Carlos Fraenkel (born 1971)
 Gary L. Francione (born 1954)
 Leslie Francis
 Manfred Frank (born 1945)
 Charles Frankel (1917–1979)
 William K. Frankena (1908–1994)
 Nancy Frankenberry (born 1947)
 Harry Frankfurt (born 1929)
 Keith Frankish
 Viktor Frankl (1905–1997)
 James Franklin (born 1953)
 Oliver Shewell Franks (1905–1992)
 Nancy Fraser (born 1947)
 Michael Frede (1940–2007)
 Hans Wilhelm Frei (1922–1988)
 Paulo Freire
 Anne Fremantle (1909–2002)
 Peter A. French (born 1942)
 Raymond Frey (1941–2012)
 Miranda Fricker (born 1966)
 Marilyn Friedman (born 1945)
 Michael Friedman (born 1947)
 Milton Friedman (1912–2006)
 Roman Frigg (born 1972)
 Robert Frodeman
 Erich Fromm (1900–1980)
 Risieri Frondizi (1910–1983)
 Marilyn Frye (born 1941)
 Northrop Frye (1912–1991)
 Lon L. Fuller (1902–1978)
 Christopher Fynsk (born 1952)

G 
 Dov Gabbay (born 1945)
 Hans-Georg Gadamer (1900–2002)
 Raimond Gaita (born 1946)
 John Kenneth Galbraith (1908–2006)
 Peter Galison (born 1955)
 Shaun Gallagher (born 1948)
 W. B. Gallie (1912–1998)
 Jonardon Ganeri
 Pieranna Garavaso
 Daniel Garber (born 1949)
 Patrick Gardiner (1922–1997)
 John Gardner (1965–2019)
 Jay L. Garfield (born 1955)
 Ann Garry
 Richard Gaskin (born 1960)
 William H. Gass (1924–2017)
 Moira Gatens (born 1954)
 Christopher Gauker
 Stephen Gaukroger (born 1950)
 Gerald Gaus (1952–2020)
 David Gauthier (born 1932)
 Peter Geach (1916–2013)
 Clifford Geertz (1926–2006)
 Arnold Gehlen (1904–1976)
 Ernest Gellner (1925–1995)
 Ken Gemes
 Tamar Gendler (born 1965)
 Eugene Gendlin (1926–2017)
 Gerhard Gentzen (1909–1945)
 Alexander George
 Robert P. George (born 1955)
 Volker Gerhardt (born 1944)
 Lloyd P. Gerson (born 1948)
 Bernard Gert (1934–2011)
 Edmund Gettier (1927–2021)
 Raymond Geuss (born 1946)
 Alan Gewirth (1912–2004)
 Rashid al-Ghannushi (born 1941)
 Michael Ghiselin (born 1939)
 Allan Gibbard (born 1942)
 James J. Gibson (1904–1979)
 Roger Gibson (1944–2015)
 Margaret Gilbert (born 1942)
 Langdon Gilkey (1919–2004)
 Mary Louise Gill
 Michael Allen Gillespie (born 1951)
 Donald A. Gillies (born 1944)
 Carol Gilligan (born 1936)
 Neil Gillman (1933–2017)
 Carl Ginet (born 1932)
 Hannah Ginsborg
 René Girard (1923–2015)
 Valéry Giroux (born 1974)
 Kristin Gjesdal
 Michael Glanzberg
 Ernst von Glasersfeld (1917–2010)
 Simon Glendinning (born 1964)
 Hans-Johann Glock (born 1960)
 Jonathan Glover (born 1941)
 Clark Glymour (born 1942)
 Paul Gochet (1932–2011)
 Kurt Gödel (1906–1978)
 Peter Godfrey-Smith (born 1965)
 Lydia Goehr (born 1960)
 Philip Goff
 Erving Goffman (1922–1982)
 Warren Goldfarb (born 1949)
 Peter Goldie (1946–2011)
 Alvin Goldman (born 1938)
 Lucien Goldmann (1913–1970)
 Victor Goldschmidt (1914-1981)
 Bernard R. Goldstein (born 1938)
 Rebecca Goldstein (born 1950)
 Dan Goldstick
 Cornelius Golightly (1917–1976)
 Jacob Golomb
 Nicolás Gómez Dávila (1913–1994)
 Alfonso Gómez-Lobo (1940–2011)
 Robert E. Goodin (born 1950)
 Robert Gooding-Williams (born 1953)
 Nelson Goodman (1906–1998)
 Paul Goodman (1911–1972)
 Alison Gopnik (born 1955)
 Lewis Gordon (born 1962)
 André Gorz (1923–2007)
 Paul Gottfried (born 1941)
 Allan Gotthelf (1942–2013)
 Anthony Gottlieb (born 1956)
 T. A. Goudge (1910–1999)
 Alvin Gouldner (1920–1980)
 Trudy Govier (born 1944)
 Jorge J. E. Gracia (1942–2021)
 James Allen Graff (1937–2005)
 L. Gordon Graham (born 1949)
 Gérard Granel (1930–2000)
 Gilles-Gaston Granger (1920–2016)
 George Grant (1918–1988)
 Ivor Grattan-Guinness (1941–2014)
 Jesse Glenn Gray (1913–1977)
 John Gray (born 1948)
 A. C. Grayling (born 1949)
 Hilary Greaves (born 1978)
 John Greco
 Celia Green (born 1935)
 Karen Green
 Leslie Green (born 1956)
 Clement Greenberg (1909–1994)
 Maxine Greene (1917–2014)
 Patricia Greenspan
 Mary J. Gregor (1928–1994)
 Marjorie Grene (1910–2009)
 Herbert Paul Grice (1913–1988)
 David Ray Griffin (born 1939)
 James Griffin (1933–2019)
 Allen Phillips Griffiths (1927–2014)
 Paul E. Griffiths (born 1962)
 Patrick Grim
 Germain Grisez (1929–2018)
 Jeroen Groenendijk (born 1949)
 Elizabeth Grosz (born 1952)
 Lori Gruen
 Adolf Grünbaum (1923–2018)
 Cynthia M. Grund (born 1956)
 Félix Guattari (1930–1992)
 Lisa Guenther
 María José Guerra Palmero (born 1962)
 Charles Guignon (1944–2020)
 Hans Ulrich Gumbrecht (born 1948)
 Gotthard Günther (1900–1984)
 Anil Gupta (born 1949)
 Aron Gurwitsch (1901–1973)
 David P. Gushee
 W. K. C. Guthrie (1906–1981)
 Samuel Guttenplan (born 1944)
 Gary Gutting (1942–2019)
 Paul Guyer (born 1948)
 Abimael Guzmán (1934–2021)
 Kwame Gyekye (1939–2019)

H 
 Susan Haack (born 1945)
 Jürgen Habermas (born 1929)
 Peter Hacker (born 1939)
 Ian Hacking (born 1936)
 John Hadley (born 1966)
 Ilsetraut Hadot (born 1928)
 Pierre Hadot (1922–2010)
 Ruth Hagengruber
 Simon Hailwood
 Volker Halbach (born 1965)
 John Haldane (born 1954)
 Bob Hale (1945–2017)
 Edward J. Hall
 Everett Hall (1901–1960)
 Manly Palmer Hall (1901–1990)
 Philip Hallie (1922–1994)
 Joseph Halpern (born 1953)
 Clive Hamilton (born 1953)
 Stuart Hampshire (1914–2004)
 Jean Elizabeth Hampton (1954–1996)
 Byung-Chul Han (born 1959)
 Gila Hanna
 Alastair Hannay (born 1932)
 Norwood Russell Hanson (1922–1967)
 Sven Ove Hansson (born 1951)
 Donna Haraway (born 1944)
 Garrett Hardin (1915–2003)
 Russell Hardin (1940–2017)
 Sandra Harding (born 1935)
 Michael Hardt (born 1960)
 John E. Hare (born 1949)
 R. M. Hare (1919–2002)
 Elizabeth Harman
 Gilbert Harman (1938–2021)
 Graham Harman (born 1968)
 Rom Harré (1927–2019)
 Karsten Harries (born 1937)
 Michael Harrington (1928–1989)
 Errol Harris (1908–2009)
 John Harris (born 1945)
 Leonard Harris
 Sam Harris (born 1967)
 Tristan Harris (born 1984)
 Zellig Harris (1909–1992)
 John Harsanyi (1920–2000)
 H. L. A. Hart (1907–1992)
 David Bentley Hart (born 1965)
 Verity Harte
 David Hartman (1931–2013)
 Robert S. Hartman (1910–1973)
 Stephan Hartmann (born 1968)
 Nancy Hartsock (1943–2015)
 Van A. Harvey (1923–2021)
 Sally Haslanger
 Gary Hatfield
 Stanley Hauerwas (born 1940)
 John Haugeland (1945–2010)
 Daniel M. Hausman (born 1947)
 David Hawkins (1913–2002)
 Katherine Hawley (1971–2021)
 John Hawthorne (born 1964)
 Matti Häyry (born 1956)
 Jane Heal (born 1946)
 Donald O. Hebb (1904–1985)
 Jennifer Michael Hecht (born 1965)
 Patrick Aidan Heelan (1926–2015)
 John Heil (born 1943)
 Klaus Heinrich (1927–2020)
 Werner Heisenberg (1901–1976)
 Virginia Held (born 1929)
 Ágnes Heller (1929–2019)
 Erich Heller (1911–1990)
 Michał Heller (born 1936)
 Futa Helu (1934–2010)
 Carl Gustav Hempel (1905–1997)
 Leon Henkin (1921–2006)
 Robert J. Henle (1909–2000)
 Dieter Henrich (1927–2022)
 Michel Henry (1922–2002)
 Will Herberg (1901-1977)
 Barbara Herman (born 1945)
 Jeanne Hersch (1910–2000)
 Abraham Joshua Heschel (1907–1972)
 Mary Hesse (1924–2016)
 Cressida Heyes (born 1970)
 John Hick (1922–2012)
 Stephen Hicks (born 1960)
 Pamela Hieronymi
 Alice von Hildebrand (born 1923)
 Christopher S. Hill (born 1942)
 Claire Ortiz Hill (born 1951)
 Alison Hills
 Jaakko Hintikka (1929–2015)
 Christopher Hitchens (1949–2011)
 Sarah Hoagland (born 1945)
 Angie Hobbs (born 1961)
 Richard Hocking (1906–2001)
 Eric Hoffer (1902–1983)
 Albert Hofstadter (1910–1989)
 Martin Hollis (1938–1998)
 Richard Holton
 Ted Honderich (born 1933)
 Axel Honneth (born 1949)
 Sidney Hook (1902–1989)
 Brad Hooker (born 1957)
 bell hooks (1952–2021)
 Jennifer Hornsby (born 1951)
 Tamara Horowitz (1950–2000)
 Oscar Horta (born 1974)
 Paul Horwich (born 1947)
 John Hospers (1918–2011)
 Paulin J. Hountondji (born 1942)
 George Hourani (1913–1984)
 Colin Howson (1945–2020)
 Hsu Fu-kuan (1903–1982)
 Michael Huemer (born 1969)
 Fiona Hughes
 George Edward Hughes (1918–1994)
 David Hull (1935–2010)
 Paul Humphreys
 Thomas Hurka (born 1952)
 Susan Hurley (1954–2007)
 Rosalind Hursthouse (born 1943)
 Douglas Husak (born 1948)
 Robert Maynard Hutchins (1899–1977)
 John Hyman (born 1960)
 Jean Hyppolite (1907–1968)

I 
 Don Ihde (born 1934)
 Ivan Illich (1926–2002)
 Evald Vassilievich Ilyenkov (1924–1979)
 Claude Imbert (born 1933)
 Bernard Ryosuke Inagaki (born 1928)
 Peter van Inwagen (born 1942)
 Michael Inwood (1944–2021)
 Luce Irigaray (born 1930)
 Terence Irwin (born 1947)
 William Irwin (born 1970)
 Jenann Ismael
 Veronica Ivy (born 1982)

J 
 Frank Jackson (born 1943)
 Jane Jacobs (1916–2006)
 Rahel Jaeggi (born 1967)
 Harry V. Jaffa (1918–2015)
 Alison Jaggar (born 1942)
 Pankaj Jain (born 1970)
 Joy James (born 1958)
 Susan James (born 1951)
 Fredric Jameson (born 1934)
 Dale Jamieson (born 1947)
 Christopher Janaway
 Erich Jantsch (1929–1980)
 Grace Jantzen (1948–2006)
 Nick Jardine (born 1943)
 Katarzyna Jaszczolt (born 1963)
 David Lyle Jeffrey
 Richard C. Jeffrey (1926–2002)
 Carrie Ichikawa Jenkins
 Fiona Jenkins (born 1965)
 Hans Joas (born 1948)
 Alejandro Jodorowsky (born 1929)
 Kyle Johannsen
 Barbara Johnson (1947–2009)
 Galen Johnson (born 1948)
 Adrian Johnston
 Mark Johnston
 Hans Jonas (1903–1993)
 Dorthe Jørgensen (born 1959)

K 
 Shelly Kagan (born 1954)
 Charles H. Kahn (born 1928)
 Daniel Kahneman (born 1934)
 Frances Kamm
 Hans Kamp (born 1940)
 Robert Kane (born 1938)
 Abraham Kaplan (1918–1993)
 David Kaplan (born 1933)
 Barrie Karp (1945–2019)
 Carol Karp (1926–1972)
 Jerrold Katz (1932–2002)
 Gordon D. Kaufman (1925–2011)
 Walter Kaufmann (1921–1980)
 Richard Kearney (born 1954)
 Evelyn Fox Keller (born 1936)
 David Kelley (born 1949)
 Sean Dorrance Kelly
 John G. Kemeny (1926–1992)
 Andreas Kemmerling (born 1950)
 Willmoore Kendall (1909–1967)
 Duncan Kennedy (born 1942)
 Anthony Kenny (born 1931)
 Joseph Kerman (1924–2014)
 Serene Khader
 Ranjana Khanna
 Mahmoud Khatami
 Kim Hyung-suk (born 1920)
 Jaegwon Kim (1934–2019)
 Martin Luther King Jr. (1929–1968)
 Elselijn Kingma (born 1981)
 Mark Kingwell (born 1963)
 Robert Kirk (born 1933)
 Richard Kirkham (born 1955)
 Elizabeth Kiss (born 1961)
 Patricia Kitcher (born 1948)
 Philip Kitcher (born 1947)
 Eva Kittay
 Peter Kivy (1934–2017)
 Stephen Cole Kleene (1909–1994)
 Martha Klein
 Peter D. Klein (born 1940)
 Ursula Klein (born 1952)
 Raymond Klibansky (1905–2005)
 George Kline (1921–2014)
 Brian Klug
 Martha Kneale (1909–2001)
 William Calvert Kneale (1906–1990)
 David M. Knight (1936–2018)
 Sue Knight
 Joshua Knobe (born 1974)
 Wilbur Knorr (1945–1997)
 Dudley Knowles (1947–2014)
 Adrienne Koch (1913–1971)
 Hans Köchler (born 1948)
 Joseph J. Kockelmans (born 1923)
 Peter Koellner
 Noretta Koertge
 Arthur Koestler (1905–1983)
 Sarah Kofman (1934–1994)
 Erazim Kohák (1933–2020)
 Lawrence Kohlberg (1927–1987)
 Alexandre Kojève (1902–1968)
 Leszek Kolakowski (1927–2009)
 Katerina Kolozova (born 1969)
 Milan Komar (1921–2006)
 Charles De Koninck (1906–1965)
 Milton R. Konvitz (1908–2003)
 Robert C. Koons
 Mario Kopić (born 1965)
 Włodzimierz Julian Korab-Karpowicz (born 1953)
 Hilary Kornblith
 Stephan Körner (1913–2000)
 Christine Korsgaard (born 1952)
 Carolyn Korsmeyer (born 1950)
 Kathrin Koslicki
 Matthew Kramer (born 1959)
 Otto Kraushaar (1901–1989)
 Michael Krausz (born 1942)
 Richard Kraut (born 1944)
 Peter Kreeft (born 1937)
 Georg Kreisel (1923–2015)
 David Farrell Krell (born 1944)
 Michael Kremer
 Norman Kretzmann (1928–1998)
 Saul Kripke (1940–2022)
 Paul Oskar Kristeller (1905–1999)
 Julia Kristeva (born 1941)
 Irving Kristol (1920–2009)
 Erik von Kuehnelt-Leddihn (1909–1999)
 Thomas Samuel Kuhn (1922–1996)
 Helga Kuhse
 Quill Kukla
 Bruce Kuklick (born 1941)
 Kalevi Kull (born 1952)
 İoanna Kuçuradi (born 1936)
 Joel J. Kupperman (1936–2020)
 Paul Kurtz (1925–2012)
 Jonathan Kvanvig (born 1954)
 Henry E. Kyburg Jr. (1928–2007)
 Will Kymlicka (born 1962)

L 
 Jacques Lacan (1901–1981)
 John Lachs (born 1934)
 Jennifer Lackey
 Philippe Lacoue-Labarthe (1940–2007)
 Jean Ladrière (1921–2007)
 Cristina Lafont (born 1967)
 Kaave Lajevardi (born 1971)
 Imre Lakatos (1922–1974)
 Karel Lambert (born 1928)
 Corliss Lamont (1902–1995)
 Mark Lance (born 1959)
 Ludwig Landgrebe (1902–1991)
 Helen S. Lang (1947–2016)
 Rae Langton (born 1961)
 François Laruelle (born 1937)
 Christopher Lasch (1932–1994)
 Serge Latouche (born 1940)
 Bruno Latour (1947–2022)
 Larry Laudan (born 1941)
 Quentin Lauer (1917–1997)
 Stephen Laurence
 Albert Lautman (1908–1944)
 Thelma Z. Lavine (1915–2011)
 Stephen Law (born 1960)
 Morris Lazerowitz (1907–1987)
 Jonathan Lear (born 1948)
 Dominique Lecourt (born 1944)
 Michèle Le Dœuff (born 1948)
 Bruce Lee (1940–1973)
 Otis Hamilton Lee (1902–1948)
 Henri Lefebvre (1901–1991)
 Claude Lefort (1924–2010)
 Brian Leftow (born 1956)
 Keith Lehrer (born 1936)
 Yeshayahu Leibowitz (1903–1994)
 Wolfgang Leidhold (born 1950)
 Werner Leinfellner (1921–2010)
 Brian Leiter (born 1963)
 Hannes Leitgeb (born 1972)
 John Lemmon (1930–1966)
 Mary Leng
 James Lenman
 Kathleen Lennon
 James G. Lennox (born 1948)
 Thomas Lepeltier (born 1967)
 Robin Le Poidevin (born 1962)
 Ernest Lepore (born 1950)
 John A. Leslie (born 1940)
 Sarah-Jane Leslie
 Michael Leunig (born 1945)
 Isaac Levi (1930–2018)
 Michael Levin (born 1943)
 Emmanuel Levinas (1906–1995)
 Joseph Levine (born 1952)
 Claude Lévi-Strauss (1908–2009)
 Bernard-Henri Lévy (born 1948)
 Tim Lewens (born 1974)
 David Kellogg Lewis (1941–2001)
 Hywel Lewis (1910–1992)
 Dimitris Liantinis (1942–1998)
 S. Matthew Liao (born 1972)
 Suzanne Lilar (1901–1992)
 Mark Lilla (born 1956)
 George Lindbeck (1923–2018)
 Hilde Lindemann
 Rudolf Lingens (born 1918)
 Alphonso Lingis (born 1933)
 Øystein Linnebo (born 1971)
 Leonard Linsky (1922–2012)
 Gilles Lipovetsky (born 1944)
 Arthur Lipsett (1936–1986)
 Peter Lipton (1954–2007)
 Christian List
 Elisabeth Lloyd (born 1956)
 Genevieve Lloyd (born 1941)
 Sharon Lloyd (born 1958)
 Barry Loewer (born 1945)
 Knud Ejler Løgstrup (1905–1981)
 Andrew Loke
 Loren Lomasky
 Alan Lomax (1915–2002)
 Bernard Lonergan (1904–1984)
 A. A. Long (born 1937)
 R. James Long (born 1938)
 Helen Longino (born 1944)
 Béatrice Longuenesse (born 1950)
 Bernard Loomer (1912–1985)
 Beth Lord (born 1976)
 Paul Lorenzen (1915–1995)
 Jerzy Łoś (1920–1998)
 E. J. Lowe (1950–2014)
 Hermann Lübbe (born 1926)
 John R. Lucas (1929–2020)
 Thomas Luckmann (1927–2016)
 Maria Lugones (1944–2020)
 Peter Ludlow (born 1957)
 Niklas Luhmann (1927–1998)
 William Lycan (born 1945)
 David Lyons (born 1935)
 Jean-François Lyotard (1924–1998)

M 
 David Macarthur
 William MacAskill (born 1987)
 Neil MacCormick (1941–2009)
 Dwight Macdonald (1906–1982)
 Margaret MacDonald (1907–1956)
 John MacFarlane
 Peter K. Machamer (born 1942)
 Tibor R. Machan (1939–2016)
 Edouard Machery
 Alasdair MacIntyre (born 1929)
 Louis Mackey (1926–2004)
 John Leslie Mackie (1917–1981)
 Penelope Mackie
 Catharine A. MacKinnon (born 1946)
 Donald M. MacKinnon (1913–1994)
 Fiona Macpherson (born 1971)
 John Macquarrie (1919–2007)
 Penelope Maddy (born 1950)
 Marylin Maeso (born 1988)
 Rosa María Rodríguez Magda (born 1957)
 Bryan Magee (1930–2019)
 Ofra Magidor
 Lorenzo Magnani (born 1952)
 Jane Maienschein (born 1950)
 Catherine Malabou (born 1959)
 David Malament (born 1947)
 Norman Malcolm (1911–1990)
 Malcolm X (1925–1965)
 Mostafa Malekian (born 1956)
 Merab Mamardashvili (1930–1990)
 Maurice Mandelbaum (1908–1987)
 Mandibil (born 1966)
 Jon Mandle
 Pierre Manent (born 1949)
 Bonnie Mann (born 1961)
 Kate Manne
 Erin Manning (born 1969)
 Harvey Mansfield (born 1932)
 Ruth Barcan Marcus (1921–2012)
 Michael Marder
 John Marenbon (born 1955)
 Henry Margenau (1901–1997)
 Joseph Margolis (1924–2021)
 Julián Marías (1914–2005)
 Jean-Luc Marion (born 1946)
 Odo Marquard (1928–2015)
 Don Marquis (1935–2022)
 Giacomo Marramao (born 1946)
 Jill Marsden (born 1964)
 Donald A. Martin (born 1940)
 Jerry L. Martin
 Michael G. F. Martin (born 1962)
 Michael Lou Martin (1932–2015)
 Richard Milton Martin (1916–1985)
 Aloysius Martinich (born 1946)
 Abraham Maslow (1908–1970)
 Michelle Mason
 Michela Massimi
 Brian Massumi (born 1956)
 Margaret Masterman (1910–1986)
 Benson Mates (1919–2009)
 Alexandre Matheron (1926–2020)
 Freya Mathews
 Bimal Krishna Matilal (1935–1991)
 Wallace Matson (1921–2012)
 Gareth Matthews (1929–2011)
 Tim Maudlin (born 1958)
 Abul A'la Maududi (1903–1979)
 George I. Mavrodes (1926–2019)
 Rollo May (1909–1994)
 Todd May (born 1955)
 John Maynard Smith (1920–2004)
 Ernst Mayr (1904–2005)
 Wolfe Mays (1912–2005)
 Noëlle McAfee
 Linda López McAlister (1939–2021)
 Herbert McCabe (1926–2001)
 M. M. McCabe (born 1948)
 John McCarthy (1927–2011)
 Thomas A. McCarthy (born 1940)
 Ron McClamrock
 Rachel McCleary
 James William McClendon Jr. (1924–2000)
 John H. McClendon
 Deirdre McCloskey (born 1942)
 Sally McConnell-Ginet (born 1938)
 John J. McDermott (1932–2018)
 John McDowell (born 1942)
 Colin McGinn (born 1950)
 Marie McGinn
 Mary Kate McGowan
 Brian McGuinness (1927–2019)
 Leemon McHenry
 Ralph McInerny (1929–2010)
 Alison McIntyre
 Terence McKenna (1946–2000)
 Robert McKim (born 1952)
 Colin McLarty
 Marshall McLuhan (1911–1980)
 Jeff McMahan (born 1954)
 Ernan McMullin (1924–2011)
 Sterling M. McMurrin (1914–1996)
 John McMurtry
 Margaret Mead (1901–1978)
 José Medina
 Brian Herbert Medlin (1927–2004)
 Paul E. Meehl (1920–2003)
 Esther Meek
 Quentin Meillassoux (born 1967)
 Alfred Mele
 David Hugh Mellor (1938–2020)
 Eduardo Mendieta (born 1963)
 Susan Mendus
 Christia Mercer
 Adèle Mercier (born 1958)
 Maurice Merleau-Ponty (1908–1961)
 Trenton Merricks
 Thomas Merton (1915–1968)
 Thomas Metzinger (born 1958)
 Frank Meyer (1909–1972)
 Leonard B. Meyer (1918–2007)
 Diana Tietjens Meyers
 Vincent Miceli (1915–1991)
 Alex Michalos (born 1935)
 Geoffrey Midgley (1921–1997)
 Mary Midgley (1919–2018)
 Stanley Milgram (1933–1984)
 Alan Millar (born 1947)
 David W. Miller (born 1942)
 Fred Miller
 George Armitage Miller (1920–2012)
 Izchak Miller (1935–1994)
 Perry Miller (1905–1963)
 Elijah Millgram (born 1958)
 Peter Millican (born 1958)
 Ruth Millikan (born 1933)
 Charles Wade Mills (1951–2021)
 Charles Wright Mills (1916–1962)
 Roberta Millstein
 Jean-Claude Milner (born 1941)
 Marvin Minsky (1927–2016)
 Cheryl Misak
 Christine Mitchell (born 1951)
 Sandra Mitchell (born 1951)
 Shaj Mohan
 Jitendra Nath Mohanty (born 1928)
 Annemarie Mol (born 1958)
 George Molnar (1934–1999)
 Ann M. Mongoven
 Ray Monk (born 1957)
 Richard Montague (1930–1971)
 Alan Montefiore (born 1926)
 Ernest Addison Moody (1903–1975)
 Michele Moody-Adams
 James H. Moor
 A. W. Moore (born 1956)
 Charles A. Moore (1901–1967)
 Michael S. Moore
 Dermot Moran
 Richard Moran
 Julius Moravcsik (1931–2009)
 Max More (born 1964)
 J. P. Moreland (born 1948)
 Sidney Morgenbesser (1921–2004)
 Marie-Eve Morin
 Charles W. Morris (1901–1979)
 Christopher W. Morris (born 1949)
 Errol Morris (born 1948)
 Herbert Morris (born 1928)
 Margaret Morrison (1954–2021)
 Adam Morton (1945-2020)
 Timothy Morton (born 1968)
 Paul Moser (born 1957)
 Bob Moses (1935–2021)
 Jesús Mosterín (1941–2017)
 Mary Mothersill (1923–2008)
 Mou Zongsan (1909–1995)
 Chantal Mouffe (born 1943)
 Richard Mouw (born 1940)
 V. Y. Mudimbe (born 1941)
 Walter George Muelder (1907–2004)
 Stephen Mulhall (born 1962)
 Vincent C. Müller
 Kevin Mulligan (born 1951)
 Stephen Mumford (born 1965)
 Véronique Munoz-Dardé
 Sachiko Murata (born 1943)
 Iris Murdoch (1919–1999)
 John E. Murdoch (1927–2010)
 Murray Murphey (1928–2018)
 Arthur Edward Murphy (1901–1962)
 Nancey Murphy (born 1951)
 John Courtney Murray (1904–1967)
 Pauli Murray (1910–1985)
 Alan Musgrave (born 1940)

N 
 Arne Næss (1912–2009)
 Yujin Nagasawa (born 1975)
 Ernest Nagel (1901–1985)
 Jennifer Nagel
 Thomas Nagel (born 1937)
 Debra Nails (born 1950)
 Jean-Luc Nancy (1940–2021)
 Meera Nanda (born 1954)
 Uma Narayan (born 1958)
 Jan Narveson (born 1936)
 John Forbes Nash Jr. (1928–2015)
 Hossein Nasr (born 1933)
 Maurice Natanson (1924–1996)
 Anthony Sean Neal
 Stephen Neale(born 1958)
 Karen Neander (1954–2020)
 Antonio Negri (born 1933)
 Oskar Negt (born 1934)
 Alexander Nehamas (born 1946)
 Susan Neiman (born 1955)
 Paul Nelson (born 1958)
 Nancy J. Nersessian
 John von Neumann (1903–1957)
 Robert Cummings Neville (born 1939)
 Allen Newell (1927–1992)
 Glen Newey (1961–2017)
 Jay Newman (1948–2007)
 William R. Newman (born 1955)
 Huey P. Newton (1942–1989)
 William Newton-Smith (born 1943)
 Shaun Nichols (born 1964)
 Eduardo Nicol (1907–1990)
 Julian Nida-Rümelin (born 1954)
 Martine Nida-Rümelin (born 1957)
 Cynthia Nielsen
 Kai Nielsen (1926–2021)
 Nishitani Keiji (1900–1990)
 David Shepherd Nivison (1923–2014)
 Paul Nizan (1905–1940)
 Kwame Nkrumah (1909–1972)
 Linda Nochlin (1931–2017)
 Nel Noddings (1929–2022)
 Alva Noë (born 1964)
 Constantin Noica (1909–1987)
 Ernst Nolte (1923–2016)
 John T. Noonan Jr. (1926–2017)
 Tore Nordenstam (born 1934)
 Kathryn Norlock (born 1969)
 Calvin Normore (born 1948)
 Christopher Norris (born 1947)
 David L. Norton (1930–1995)
 John D. Norton (born 1953)
 Kathleen Nott (1905–1999)
 Robert Nozick (1938–2001)
 Martha Nussbaum (born 1947)
 Mwalimu Julius Kambarage Nyerere (1922–1999)

O 
 Lucy O'Brien (born 1964)
 Mary O'Brien (1926–1998)
 Peg O'Connor
 Anthony O'Hear (born 1942)
 Brian E. O'Neil (1921–1985)
 Onora O'Neill (born 1941)
 Michael Oakeshott (1901–1990)
 Graham Oddie
 David S. Oderberg
 Jaishree Odin
 Charles Kay Ogden
 Ruwen Ogien
 Samir Okasha
 Susan Moller Okin (1946–2004)
 Kelly Oliver (born 1958)
 Revilo P. Oliver (1908–1994)
 Alan M. Olson (born 1939)
 Michel Onfray (born 1959)
 Walter Jackson Ong (1912–2003)
 Graham Oppy (born 1960)
 Toby Ord (born 1979)
 Gloria Origgi (born 1967)
 Rocío Orsi (1976-2014)
 Charles E. Osgood (1916–1991)
 Blake Ostler (born 1957)
 Konrad Ott (born 1959)
 James Otteson (born 1968)
 Albert Outler (1908–1989)
 Gwilyn Ellis Lane Owen (1922–1982)
 Joseph Owens (1908–2005)
 Susan Oyama (born 1943)

P 
 Jesús Padilla Gálvez (born 1959)
 Peter Pagin (born 1953)
 Clare Palmer (born 1967)
 Arthur Pap (1921–1959)
 David Papineau (born 1947)
 George Pappas (born 1942)
 Derek Parfit (1942–2017)
 Rohit Jivanlal Parikh (born 1936)
 Adrian Parr (born 1967)
 Charles Parsons (born 1933)
 Terence Parsons (born 1939)
 Barbara Partee (born 1940)
 John Passmore (1914–2004)
 Jan Patočka (1907–1977)
 Paul R. Patton (born 1950)
 L. A. Paul
 David L. Paulsen (1936-2020)
 Christopher Peacocke (born 1950)
 David Pearce
 David Pears (1921–2009)
 Shirzad Peik Herfeh (born 1980)
 Leonard Peikoff (born 1933)
 Jean-Jacques Pelletier (born 1947)
 Zbigniew Pełczyński (1925–2021)
 Lorenzo Peña (born 1944)
 Carlo Penco (born 1948)
 Terence Penelhum (1929–2020)
 Roger Penrose (born 1931)
 Walker Percy (1916–1990)
 Derk Pereboom (born 1957)
 Carlos Pereda
 Chaïm Perelman (1912–1984)
 John Perry (born 1943)
 Richard Stanley Peters (1919–2011)
 Anna L. Peterson (born 1963)
 Philip Pettit (born 1945)
 Herman Philipse (born 1951)
 D. Z. Phillips (1934–2006)
 James Andrew Phillips
 Giovanni Piana (1940–2019)
 Alexander Piatigorsky (1929–2009)
 Eva Picardi (1948-2017)
 Gualtiero Piccinini (born 1970)
 Hanna Pickard (born 1972)
 Catherine Pickstock (born 1970)
 Josef Pieper (1904-1997)
 Jessica Pierce (born 1965)
 Massimo Pigliucci (born 1964)
 Adrian Piper (born 1948)
 Robert B. Pippin (born 1948)
 Madsen Pirie (born 1940)
 Robert M. Pirsig (1928–2017)
 George Pitcher (1925–2018)
 Ullin Place (1924–2000)
 John Plamenatz (1912–1975)
 Alvin Plantinga (born 1932)
 Mark de Bretton Platts (born 1947)
 Evelyn Pluhar
 Val Plumwood (1939–2008)
 Deborah C. Poff
 Thomas Pogge (born 1953)
 Louis P. Pojman (1935–2005)
 John L. Pollock (1940–2009)
 Leonardo Polo (1926–2013)
 Edward Pols (1919–2005)
 Richard Polt
 Richard Popkin (1923–2005)
 K. J. Popma (1903–1986)
 Karl Popper (1902–1994)
 Richard Posner (born 1939)
 Mark Poster (1941–2012)
 Carl Posy
 Van Rensselaer Potter (1911–2001)
 John Poulakos (born 1948)
 Vaughan Pratt (born 1944)
 Dag Prawitz (born 1936)
 Huw Price (born 1953)
 Graham Priest (born 1948)
 Jesse Prinz
 Arthur Prior (1914–1969)
 Duncan Pritchard
 James Pryor (born 1968)
 Harry Prosch (1917–2005)
 Alexander Pruss (born 1973)
 James Pryor (born 1968)
 Stathis Psillos (born 1965)
 Lorenz Bruno Puntel (born 1935)
 Hilary Putnam (1926–2016)
 Ruth Anna Putnam (1927–2019)
 Andrew Pyle (born 1955)
 Zenon Pylyshyn (born 1937)

Q 
 Qiu Renzong (born 1933)
 Willard Van Orman Quine (1908–2000)
 Philip L. Quinn (1940–2004)
 Anthony Quinton (1925–2010)
 Sayyid Qutb (1906–1966)

R 
 Wlodek Rabinowicz (born 1947)
 Eduardo Rabossi (1930–2005)
 James Rachels (1941–2003)
 Melvin Rader (1903–1981)
 Karl Rahner (1904–1984)
 Peter Railton (born 1950)
 Vojin Rakić (born 1967)
 Tariq Ramadan (born 1962)
 Frank P. Ramsey (1903–1930)*
 Ian Thomas Ramsey (1915–1972)
 Paul Ramsey (1913–1988)
 Jacques Rancière (born 1940)
 Ayn Rand (1905–1982)
 Rose Rand (1903–1980)
 William J. Rapaport
 Anatol Rapoport (1911–2007)
 David M. Rasmussen
 Douglas B. Rasmussen (born 1948)
 Joseph Ratzinger (born 1927)
 Heidi Ravven (born 1952)
 John Rawls (1921–2002)
 Yvanka B. Raynova (born 1959)
 Joseph Raz (born 1939)
 Michael C. Rea
 Miguel Reale (1910–2006)
 François Recanati (born 1952)
 Andrew J. Reck (1927–2021)
 Michael Redhead (1929–2020)
 Jonathan Rée (born 1948)
 Tom Regan (1938–2017)
 Bernard Reginster
 Robert Reich (born 1946)
 Patricia Reif (1930–2002)
 George Reisman (born 1937)
 Nicholas Rescher (born 1928)
 Michael Resnik (born 1938)
 Greg Restall (born 1969)
 Georges Rey (born 1945)
 Rush Rhees (1905–1989)
 Janet Radcliffe Richards (born 1944)
 Henry S. Richardson (born 1955)
 John Richardson (born 1951)
 Radovan Richta (1924–1983)
 Paul Ricœur (1913–2005)
 Denise Riley (born 1948)
 Joachim Ritter (1903–1974)
 Abraham Robinson (1918–1974)
 Cedric Robinson (1940-2016)
 Howard Robinson (born 1945)
 Jenefer Robinson
 R. R. Rockingham Gill (born 1944)
 Nayef Al-Rodhan (born 1959)
 Sebastian Rödl (born 1967)
 Wendy Anne Rogers (born 1957)
 Bernard Rollin (born 1943)
 Holmes Rolston III (born 1932)
 Avital Ronell (born 1952)
 David Roochnik (born 1951)
 Amélie Rorty (1932–2020)
 Richard Rorty (1931–2007)
 Eugene Dennis Rose (1934-1982)
 Gillian Rose (1947–1995)
 Philipp Rosemann (born 1964)
 Gideon Rosen (born 1962)
 Michael E. Rosen (born 1952)
 Stanley Rosen (1929–2014)
 Alexander Rosenberg (born 1946)
 Harold Rosenberg (1906–1978)
 Jay Rosenberg (1942–2008)
 Nancy L. Rosenblum (born 1947)
 David M. Rosenthal
 Sandra B. Rosenthal (born 1936)
 Daniel Ross (born 1970)
 James F. Ross (1931–2010)
 Clément Rosset (1939–2018)
 Gian-Carlo Rota (1932–1999)
 John K. Roth (born 1940)
 Daniel Rothschild (born 1979)
 Brian Rotman
 Joseph Rovan (1918–2004)
 William L. Rowe (1931–2015)
 Mark Rowlands (born 1962)
 Sara Ruddick (1935–2011)
 Rosemary Radford Ruether (born 1936)
 Laura Ruetsche
 Ian Rumfitt (born 1964)
 Michael Ruse (born 1940)
 Gilbert Ryle (1900–1976)
 Robert Rynasiewicz
 David Rynin (1905–2000)

S 
 Mark Sainsbury (born 1943)
 Alia Al-Saji
 Jean-Michel Salanskis (born 1951)
 Ariel Salleh
 John Sallis (born 1938)
 Nathan Salmon (born 1951)
 Wesley Salmon (1925–2001)
 Michael J. Sandel (born 1953)
 Constantine Sandis (born 1976)
 David H. Sanford (born 1937)
 Steve F. Sapontzis (born 1945)
 Prabhat Rainjan Sarkar (1921–1990)
 Sahotra Sarkar (born 1962)
 Jean-Paul Sartre (1905–1980)
 Crispin Sartwell (born 1958)
 Barbara Sattler (born 1974)
 Debra Satz
 Jennifer Saul (born 1968)
 John Ralston Saul (born 1947)
 Simon Saunders (born 1954)
 Fernando Savater (born 1947)
 Julian Savulescu (born 1963)
 Geoffrey Sayre-McCord (born 1956)
 Thomas Scanlon (born 1940)
 Elaine Scarry (born 1946)
 Margaret Schabas (born 1954)
 Richard Schacht (born 1941)
 Francis Schaeffer (1912–1984)
 Jonathan Schaffer
 Kenneth F. Schaffner (born 1939)
 James V. Schall (1928–2019)
 Israel Scheffler (1923–2014)
 Samuel Scheffler (born 1951)
 J. L. Schellenberg (born 1959)
 Susanna Schellenberg
 Naomi Scheman
 Stephen Schiffer (born 1940)
 Hubert Schleichert (1935–2020)
 David Schmidtz (born 1955)
 J. B. Schneewind (born 1930)
 Malcolm Schofield (born 1942)
 Barbara Scholz (1947–2011)
 Sally Scholz (born 1968)
 Mark Schroeder
 Bart Schultz (born 1951)
 Dana Scott (born 1932)
 Michael Scriven (born 1928)
 Frithjof Schuon (1907–1998)
 Reiner Schürmann (1941–1993)
 Ofelia Schutte (born 1945)
 Lisa H. Schwartzman (born 1969)
 Steven Schwarzschild (1924–1989)
 Eric Schwitzgebel
 Charles E. Scott (born 1935)
 Dana Scott (born 1932)
 Carolina Scotto (born 1958)
 Roger Scruton (1944–2020)
 John Searle (born 1932)
 Jeff Sebo (born 1983)
 Sally Sedgwick
 David Sedley (born 1947)
 Thomas Seebohm (1934–2014)
 Jerome Segal (born 1943)
 Scott Sehon (born 1963)
 Wilfrid Sellars (1912–1989)
 Amartya Sen (born 1933)
 Michel Serres (1930–2019)
 Neven Sesardić (born 1949)
 Russ Shafer-Landau (born 1963)
 Oron Shagrir
 Timothy Shanahan (born 1960)
 Stuart Shanker (born 1952)
 Lawrence Shapiro
 Lisa Shapiro (born 1967)
 Scott J. Shapiro
 Stewart Shapiro (born 1951)
 A Satyanarayana Shastri (1925–2004)
 Steven Shaviro (born 1954)
 Dariush Shayegan (1935–2018)
 Tommie Shelby (born 1967)
 Susan Shell (born 1948)
 Gila Sher
 Donald W. Sherburne (1929–2021)
 Nancy Sherman (born 1951)
 Susan Sherwin (born 1947)
 Christopher Shields (born 1958)
 Seana Shiffrin
 Abner Shimony (1928–2015)
 Judith N. Shklar (1928–1992)
 Sydney Shoemaker (1931–2022)
 Alexis Shotwell (born 1974)
 Kristin Shrader-Frechette (born 1944)
 Laurie Shrage
 Henry Shue (born 1940)
 Richard Shusterman (born 1949)
 Frank Sibley (1923–1996)
 Theodore Sider
 David Sidorsky (born 1927)
 Larry Siedentop (born 1936)
 Susanna Siegel
 John Silber (1926–2012)
 Hugh J. Silverman (1945–2013)
 Anita Silvers (1940–2019)
 May Sim (born 1962)
 Alison Simmons (born 1965)
 Keith Simmons
 Herbert A. Simon (1916–2001)
 Yves Simon (1903–1961)
 Gilbert Simondon (1924–1989)
 Peter Simons (born 1950)
 William Angus Sinclair (1905–1954)
 Irving Singer (1925–2015)
 Marcus George Singer (1926–2016)
 Peter Singer (born 1946)
 Walter Sinnott-Armstrong (born 1955)
 Guy Sircello (1936–1992)
 B. F. Skinner (1904–1990)
 Lawrence Sklar (born 1938)
 John Skorupski (born 1946)
 Brian Skyrms (born 1938)
 Christina Slade (born 1953)
 Aaron Sloman (born 1936)
 Michael Slote
 Peter Sloterdijk (born 1947)
 Hans Sluga (born 1937)
 J. J. C. Smart (1920–2012)
 Ninian Smart (1927–2001)
 Timothy Smiley (born 1930)
 Barry Smith (born 1952)
 Daniel W. Smith (born 1958)
 Holly Martin Smith
 Huston Smith (1919–2016)
 John Edwin Smith (1921–2009)
 Michael A. Smith (born 1954)
 Nicholas D. Smith (born 1949)
 Nicholas H. Smith (born 1962)
 Nicholas J. J. Smith (born 1972)
 Tara Smith (born 1961)
 Raymond Smullyan (1919–2017)
 John Raymond Smythies (1922–2019)
 Yorick Smythies (1917–1980)
 Joseph D. Sneed (1938–2020)
 Nancy Snow
 Scott Soames (born 1946)
 Jordan Howard Sobel (1929–2010)
 Elliott Sober (born 1948)
 Alan Soble (born 1947)
 Robert Sokolowski (born 1934)
 Miriam Solomon
 Robert C. Solomon (1942–2007)
 Joseph Soloveitchik (1903–1993)
 Margaret Somerville (born 1942)
 Christina Hoff Sommers (born 1950)
 Fred Sommers (1923–2014)
 Tamler Sommers
 Susan Sontag (1933–2004)
 Kate Soper (born 1943)
 Richard Sorabji (born 1934)
 Stefan Lorenz Sorgner (born 1973)
 Abdolkarim Soroush (born 1945)
 David Sosa
 Ernest Sosa (born 1940)
 Janet Soskice (born 1951)
 Nicholas Southwood
 Thomas Sowell (born 1930)
 Robert Spaemann (1927–2018)
 David Spangler (born 1945)
 Elizabeth V. Spelman
 Dan Sperber (born 1942)
 Herbert Spiegelberg (1904–1990)
 Robert Spitzer (born 1952)
 Gayatri Chakravorty Spivak (born 1942)
 Wolfgang Spohn (born 1950)
 Jan Michael Sprenger (born 1982)
 Timothy Sprigge (1932–2007)
 Susanne Sreedhar
 Amia Srinivasan (born 1984)
 Edward Stachura (1937–1979)
 Konstantinos Staikos (born 1943)
 Newton Phelps Stallknecht (1906–1981)
 Robert Stalnaker (born 1940)
 Jeremy Stangroom
 Jason Stanley (born 1969)
 Glen Stassen (1936–2014)
 Wolfgang Stegmüller (1923–1991)
 Mark Steiner (1942–2020)
 Isabelle Stengers (born 1949)
 Gunther Stent (1924–2008)
 James P. Sterba
 Kim Sterelny (born 1950)
 Robert Stern (born 1962)
 Dolf Sternberger (1907–1989)
 Charles Leslie Stevenson (1908–1979)
 Helen Steward (born 1965)
 Jon Stewart
 Stephen Stich (born 1943) 
 Bernard Stiegler (1952–2020)
 Gail Stine (1940–1977)
 Kathleen Stock (born 1972)
 Dejan Stojanović (born 1959)
 Patrick Stokes (1978)
 Martin Stokhof (born 1950)
 Daniel Stoljar (born 1967)
 Alison Stone
 Karola Stotz (1963–2019)
 Jeffrey Stout (born 1950)
 David Stove (1927–1994)
 Galen Strawson (born 1952)
 P. F. Strawson (1919–2006)
 Sharon Street (born 1973)
 Gisela Striker (born 1943)
 Avrum Stroll (1921–2013)
 Edward Strong (1901–1990)
 Barry Stroud (1935–2019)
 Matthew Stuart
 John J. Stuhr
 Eleonore Stump (born 1947)
 Shannon Sullivan
 Cass Sunstein (born 1954)
 Anita Superson
 Frederick Suppe (born 1940)
 Patrick Suppes (1922–2014)
 Stewart Sutherland (1941–2018)
 Goran Švob (1947–2013)
 Norman Swartz (born 1939)
 William Sweet
 Brendan Sweetman (born 1962)
 Richard Swinburne (born 1934)
 Thomas Szasz (1920–2012)
 Edmond Bordeaux Szekely (1905–1979)
 Peter Szendy (born 1966)
 David Sztybel (born 1967)

T 
 Javad Tabatabai (born 1945)
 William W. Tait (born 1929)
 Nassim Nicholas Taleb (born 1960)
 Charles Taliaferro (born 1952)
 Robert B. Talisse (born 1970)
 Konrad Talmont-Kamiński (born 1971)
 Jacques Taminiaux (1928–2019)
 Tang Junyi (1909–1978)
 Torbjörn Tännsjö (born 1946)
 Alfred Tarski (1901–1983)
 John Tasioulas (born 1964)
 Alfred I. Tauber (born 1947)
 Charles Taylor (born 1931)
 Gabriele Taylor (born 1927)
 Kenneth Allen Taylor (1954–2019)
 Paul C. Taylor (born 1967)
 Paul W. Taylor (1923–2015)
 Richard Taylor (1919–2003)
 Jenny Teichman (1930–2018)
 Larry Temkin
 Placide Tempels (1906–1977)
 Sergio Tenenbaum (born 1964)
 Neil Tennant (born 1950)
 Alice ter Meulen (born 1952)
 Lisa Tessman
 Eugene Thacker
 Paul Thagard (born 1950)
 Irving Thalberg Jr. (1930–1987)
 Helmut Thielicke (1908–1986)
 Laurence Thomas (born 1949)
 Amie Thomasson (born 1968)
 Josiah Thompson (born 1935)
 Patricia Thompson (1926–2016)
 Paul B. Thompson
 Judith Jarvis Thomson (1929–2020)
 Ole Thyssen (born 1944)
 Valerie Tiberius
 Pavel Tichý (1936–1994)
 Claudine Tiercelin (born 1952)
 Lynne Tirrell
 Tzvetan Todorov (1939–2017)
 Julius Tomin (born 1938)
 Rosemarie Tong (born 1949)
 Michael Tooley (born 1941)
 Roberto Torretti (born 1930)
 Stephen Toulmin (1922–2009)
 Cecilia Trifogli (born 1961)
 Roger Trigg (born 1941)
 Tsang Lap Chuen (born 1943)
 Mpho Tshivhase
 Nancy Tuana
 Peter Tudvad (born 1966)
 Ernst Tugendhat (born 1930)
 Raimo Tuomela (1940–2020)
 Colin Murray Turbayne (1916–2006)
 Alan Turing (1912–1954)
 Ray Turner (born 1947)
 Stephen Park Turner (born 1951)
 Joseph Tussman (1914–2005)
 Michael Tye (born 1950)
 Anna-Teresa Tymieniecka (1923–2014)

U 
 Thomas Uebel (born 1952)
 Peter Unger (born 1942)
 Roberto Mangabeira Unger (born 1947)
 Ivo Urbančič (1930–2016)
 J. O. Urmson (1915–2012)
 Alasdair Urquhart (born 1945)

V 
 William F. Vallicella
 Johan van Benthem (born 1949)
 Herman Van Breda (1911–1974)
 Bas van Fraassen (born 1941)
 Tim van Gelder
 Jean van Heijenoort (1912–1986)
 Jean Vanier (1928–2019)
 Peter van Inwagen (born 1942)
 Luuk van Middelaar (born 1973)
 Bryan W. Van Norden (born 1962)
 Philippe Van Parijs (born 1951)
 Peter Vardy (born 1945)
 Francisco Varela (1946–2001)
 Gary Varner (born 1957)
 Juha Varto (born 1949)
 Achille Varzi (born 1958)
 Gianni Vattimo (born 1936)
 Achille Varzi (born 1958)
 Nicla Vassallo (born 1963)
 Adolfo Sánchez Vázquez (1915–2011)
 Henry Babcock Veatch (1911–1997)
 J. David Velleman (born 1952)
 Zeno Vendler (1921–2004)
 Giovanni Ventimiglia
 Peter-Paul Verbeek (born 1971)
 Dirk Verhofstadt (born 1955)
 Etienne Vermeersch (1934–2019)
 Michel Villey (1914–1988)
 Paul Virilio (1932–2018)
 Eliseo Vivas (1901–1991)
 Gregory Vlastos (1907–1991)
 Eric Voegelin (1901–1985)
 Candace Vogler
 John von Neumann (1903–1957)
 Heinrich von Staden (born 1939)
 Jules Vuillemin (1920–2001)

W 
 Jeremy Waldron (born 1953)
 Margaret Urban Walker (born 1948)
 Mark Alan Walker (born 1963)
 Ralph C. S. Walker (born 1944)
 R. Jay Wallace (born 1957)
 Adrian Walsh (born 1963)
 W. H. Walsh (1913–1986)
 Douglas N. Walton (1942–2020)
 Kendall Walton (born 1939)
 Wil Waluchow (born 1953)
 Michael Walzer (born 1935)
 Ernest Wamba dia Wamba (1942–2020)
 Hao Wang (1921–1995)
 Nigel Warburton (born 1962)
 Keith Ward (born 1938)
 Georgia Warnke
 Geoffrey J. Warnock (1923–1996)
 Mary Warnock (1924–2019)
 Karen J. Warren (1947–2020)
 Thomas B. Warren (1920–2000)
 Marx W. Wartofsky (1928–1997)
 Robin Waterfield (born 1952)
 John W. N. Watkins (1924–1999)
 John Leonard Watling (1923–2004)
 Alan Watts (1915–1973)
 Paul Watzlawick (1921–2007)
 Helmut Wautischer
 Brian Weatherson
 Richard M. Weaver (1910–1963)
 Eugene Webb (born 1938)
 Michel Weber (born 1963)
 William Stone Weedon (1908–1984)
 Simone Weil (1909–1943)
 Rivka Weinberg
 Joan Weiner
 Jack Russell Weinstein (born 1969)
 Paul Weiss (1901–2002)
 Morris Weitz (1916–1981)
 Carl Friedrich von Weizsäcker (1912–2007)
 Philip Welch (born 1954)
 Christopher Heath Wellman (born 1967)
 Albrecht Wellmer (1933–2018)
 Peter Wenz (born 1945)
 Archibald Garden Wernham (1916–1989)
 Cornel West (born 1953)
 Robert B. Westbrook (born 1950)
 Anthony Weston (born 1954)
 Philip Wheelwright (1901–1970)
 Rebecca Whisnant
 Alan White (born 1951)
 Alan R. White (1922–1992)
 Morton White (1917–2016)
 Jennifer Whiting
 Kyle Powys Whyte
 Heather Widdows (born 1972)
 Nettie Wiebe (born 1949)
 Philip P. Wiener (1905–1992)
 David Wiggins (born 1933)
 Dan Wikler (born 1946)
 John Daniel Wild (1902–1972)
 Frederick Wilhelmsen (1923–1996)
 Kathy Wilkes (1946–2003)
 Dallas Willard (1935–2013)
 Cynthia Willett
 Bernard Williams (1929–2003)
 C. J. F. Williams (1930–1997)
 Michael Williams (born 1947)
 Timothy Williamson (born 1955)
 Jan Willis (born 1948)
 Amos N. Wilson (1940/41–1995)
 Catherine Wilson (born 1951)
 Jessica Wilson
 Margaret Dauler Wilson (1939–1998)
 Mark Wilson (born 1947)
 Robert Wilson (born 1964)
 William C. Wimsatt (born 1941)
 Peter Winch (1926–1997)
 Richard Dien Winfield (born 1950)
 Ajume Wingo
 Langdon Winner (born 1944)
 William J. Winslade (born 1941)
 Kwasi Wiredu (born 1931)
 John Wisdom (1904–1993)
 John Oulton Wisdom (1908–1993)
 Charlotte Witt (born 1951)
 Monique Wittig (1935–2003)
 Karol Wojtyła (1920–2005)
 Jan Woleński (born 1940)
 Susan R. Wolf (born 1952)
 Ursula Wolf (born 1951)
 Jonathan Wolff (born 1959)
 Robert Paul Wolff (born 1933)
 Sybil Wolfram (1931–1993)
 Elizabeth Wolgast (1929–2020)
 Sheldon Wolin (1922–2015)
 Richard Wollheim (1923–2003)
 Nicholas Wolterstorff (born 1932)
 David B. Wong
 Allen W. Wood (born 1942)
 David Wood (born 1946)
 W. Hugh Woodin (born 1955)
 Paul Woodruff (born 1943)
 John Woods (born 1937)
 Raphael Woolf
 John Worrall (born 1946)
 Mark Wrathall (born 1965)
 Crispin Wright (born 1942)
 Georg Henrik von Wright (1916–2003)
 W. D. Wright (born 1936)
 Jerzy Wróblewski (1926–1990)
 Alison Wylie (born 1954)
 Mark Wynn (born 1963)
 Edith Wyschogrod (1930–2009)

X 
 Xu Liangying (1920–2013)

Y 
 Stephen Yablo
 George Yancy (born 1961)
 Keith Yandell (1938–2020)
 Cemal Yıldırım (1925–2009)
 Francis Parker Yockey (1917–1960)
 John Howard Yoder (1927–1997)
 John W. Yolton (1921–2005)
 Robert M. Yost (1917–2006)
 Arthur M. Young (1905–1995)
 Damon Young (born 1975)
 Iris Marion Young (1949–2006)
 Julian Young (born 1943)
 Robert M. Young (1935–2019)
 Jiyuan Yu (1964–2016)

Z 
 Santiago Zabala (born 1975)
 Richard Zach
 Naomi Zack
 Linda Trinkaus Zagzebski (born 1946)
 Dan Zahavi (born 1967)
 José Zalabardo (born 1964)
 Edward N. Zalta (born 1952)
 María Zambrano (1904–1991)
 Marlène Zarader (born 1949)
 Ingo Zechner (born 1972)
 Eddy Zemach
 John Zerzan (born 1943)
 Zhou Guoping (born 1945)
 Zygmunt Ziembiński (1920–1996)
 Paul Ziff (1920–2003)
 Robert Zimmer (born 1953)
 Dean Zimmerman
 Michael E. Zimmerman (born 1946)
 Alexander Zinoviev (1922–2006)
 Slavoj Žižek (born 1949)
 Elémire Zolla (1926–2002)
 Volker Zotz (born 1956)
 François Zourabichvili (1965–2006)
 Catherine Zuckert (born 1942)
 Michael Zuckert (born 1942)
 Rachel Zuckert (born 1969)
 Estanislao Zuleta (1935–1990)
 Alenka Zupančič (born 1965)
 Jan Zwicky (born 1955)

See also 
 20th-century philosophy
 List of philosophers born in the centuries BC
 List of philosophers born in the 1st through 10th centuries
 List of philosophers born in the 11th through 14th centuries
 List of philosophers born in the 15th and 16th centuries
 List of philosophers born in the 17th century
 List of philosophers born in the 18th century
 List of philosophers born in the 19th century

Notes 

20
Lists of 20th-century people